The Irish Pub of Kabul was a pub in Kabul, Afghanistan; it opened on Saint Patrick's Day, 2003.

Owner Sean Martin McQuade received approval of a local mullah by promising to repair the road adjacent to the club and assist in relocating a nearby school to a larger site. The pub is licensed by the Afghan government, with the caveat that it not sell alcohol to Afghans. When interviewed a staff member of the bar commented, "Our families know what we do, but we tell other people we just work in a restaurant or a guesthouse selling food and soft drinks." Within 2 months of opening it received warnings of a possible attack and temporarily closed. By September of the next year the bar had moved into a Kabul hotel.

References

Further reading
The Survival Guide to Kabul, The Irish Club

Buildings and structures in Kabul
Companies of Afghanistan
Drinking establishments in Asia
2003 establishments in Afghanistan
Restaurants established in 2003